The Rezhanovce Museum of Folk Costumes is a museum in the village of Rezhanovce near Kumanovo, North Macedonia.

The museum holds over 800 folk costumes and 400 carpets, mainly from North Macedonia, but also from Bulgaria, Serbia, Albania, and Greece, mostly from 19th and 20th century.

See also
 List of museums in North Macedonia

References

External links
 Божјата сила на Злате собра 450 носии на едно место vest.com.mk 11/13/2004

Museums with year of establishment missing
Museums in North Macedonia
Costume museums
Folk museums in Europe
Kumanovo Municipality